AFID may stand for:

Accounting for International Development (AfID), a British non-profit organization
Air Force Intelligence Directorate, an intelligence service of Syria
Alkali flame-ionization detector, a type of flame thermionic detector (FTD) used in gas chromatography
Anti-felon identification system, a feature of some models of Taser